Jake Paul vs Tommy Fury, billed as The Truth, was a professional boxing match contested between Jake Paul and Tommy Fury. The bout took place on 26 February 2023 in the Diriyah Arena, Diriyah, Saudi Arabia. Fury won by split decision.

Background 

Originally, Paul was scheduled to fight Tommy Fury on 18 December 2021. However, due to an injury, Fury pulled from the fight and was replaced by former UFC Welterweight Champion Tyron Woodley instead in a rematch billed as Leave No Doubt. 

Paul was scheduled to fight Fury again on 6 August 2022. However, Fury pulled out of the bout due to travel issues. It was announced on 7 July 2022, that Hasim Rahman Jr. would replace Fury in the fight. This bout was also cancelled due to "weight-issues" (Rahman Jr. coming in overweight), and that all sales towards that fight would be refunded.

On February 26, 2023, Jake Paul fought British Boxer Tommy Fury in an eight-round cruiserweight fight. The fight took place in Diriyah, Saudi Arabia and resulted in a split decision victory in favor of Tommy Fury. Two judges scored the bout 76-73 for Fury, while a third favored Paul by 75-74.

Fight card

Broadcasting

References

External links 

2023 in boxing
2023 in Saudi Arabian sport
Boxing matches
Crossover boxing events
February 2023 sports events in Saudi Arabia
Pay-per-view boxing matches